SON is a Galician political party created in 2015, promoted by Renewal–Nationalist Brotherhood (Anova) and United Left to participate in the local elections of the same year.

Its purpose is to provide legal support to those groups that, for legal reasons, had no possibility to run in the elections of their municipality. Likewise, SON also seeks to gain representation in the provincial deputations. In practice it is an "instrumental" party, without permanent bodies, and whose only objective is to support local candidacies.

Election results
After the local elections, SON gained the mayoralties of Cangas, Ferrol, Manzaneda, Teo and Val do Dubra. In 2016, after a motion of no confidence, Son also gained the mayoralty of Mugardos.

SON gained 53,205 votes in total (3.61%).

References

2015 establishments in Galicia (Spain)
Left-wing politics in Spain
Political parties established in 2015
Political parties in Galicia (Spain)
Socialist parties in Galicia (Spain)